Niice 'n Wiild is the second and most recent studio album by the Los Angeles, California-based singer/producer Chuckii Booker.

Reception

Released in August 1992 the album charted number 13 on the R&B Album Charts.

Track listing
 All Songs Written By Chuckii Booker, except as noted.

"Spinnin'" (4:04)
"Love Is Medicine" (5:26)
"Out Of The Dark" (Chuckii Booker, Donnell Spencer, Jr.) (4:33)
"You Don't Know" (6:11)
"With All My Heart" (4:54)
"I Giit Around" (7:14)
"Games"	(Chuckii Booker, Gerald Levert, C.J. Anthony) (5:26)
"Deep C Diiver" (Chuckii Booker, Raymond A. Shields, II) (6:25)
"Front Line" (5:47)
"Soul Triilogy I" (Chuckii Booker, Derek Organ, Tommy Organ) (3:46)
"Soul Triilogy II" (Chuckii Booker, Derek "D.O.A." Allen) (1:49)
"Soul Triilogy III" (Chuckii Booker, Derek "D.O.A." Allen) (2:18)
"Niice N' Wiild" (Chuckii Booker, Derek Organ) (5:25)
"I Should Have Loved You" (5:40)
"For Lovers Only" (5:27)

Charts

Album

Singles

External links
 Chuckii Booker-Niice 'N Wiild at Discogs

References

1992 albums
Chuckii Booker albums
Atlantic Records albums